In mathematics, a harmonic morphism is a (smooth) map  between Riemannian manifolds that pulls back real-valued harmonic functions on the codomain to harmonic functions on the domain. Harmonic morphisms form a special class of harmonic maps i.e. those that are horizontally (weakly) conformal.

 

The horizontal conformality is given by 

where the conformal factor  is a continuous function called the dilation. Harmonic morphisms are therefore solutions to non-linear over-determined systems of partial differential equations, determined by the geometric data of the manifolds involved.  For this reason, they  are difficult to find and have no general existence theory, not even locally.

Complex analysis 

This means that, at least for local studies, the codomain can be chosen to be the complex plane with its standard flat metric. In this situation a complex-valued function   is a harmonic morphisms if and only if 

and

This means that we look for two real-valued harmonic functions  with gradients  that are orthogonal and of the same norm at each point.  This shows that complex-valued harmonic morphisms  from Riemannian manifolds generalise holomorphic functions  from Kähler manifolds and possess many of their highly interesting properties. The theory of harmonic morphisms can therefore be seen as a generalisation of complex analysis.

Minimal surfaces 

In differential geometry, one is interested in constructing minimal submanifolds of a given ambient space .  Harmonic morphisms are useful tools for this purpose.  This is due to the fact that every regular fibre  of such a map  with values in a surface is a minimal submanifold of the domain with codimension 2. This gives an attractive method for manufacturing whole families of minimal surfaces in 4-dimensional manifolds , in particular,   homogeneous spaces, such as Lie groups and symmetric spaces.

Examples 

 Identity and constant maps are harmonic morphisms.
 Holomorphic functions in the complex plane are harmonic morphisms.
 Holomorphic functions in the complex vector space  are harmonic morphisms.
 Holomorphic maps from Kähler manifolds with values in a Riemann surface are harmonic morphisms.
 For compact Lie groups  the standard Riemannian fibration  is a harmonic morphism.
 Riemannian submersions with minimal fibres are harmonic morphisms.

References

External links 
 The Bibliography of Harmonic Morphisms, offered by Sigmundur Gudmundsson

Riemannian geometry
Harmonic functions
Analytic functions